Ram Narayan Chakravarti (1916–2007) was an Indian phytochemist, scientist and the Director of the erstwhile Indian Institute of Experimental Medicine (present-day Indian Institute of Chemical Biology),  known for his contributions to the science of medicinal chemistry. Born in 1916, he secured a DSc from Kolkata University and worked as a Professor and the deputy director of the Calcutta School of Tropical Medicine before becoming the director of the Indian Institute of Experimental Medicine. His researches were reported to have assisted studies of medicinal plants and have been documented by way of several articles published by him. He was a fellow of the Royal Society of Chemistry and an elected fellow of the Indian National Science Academy. The Government of India awarded him the third highest civilian honour of the Padma Bhushan, in 1972, for his contributions to science. He died on 31 May 2007, at the age of 91. The Post Graduate Institute of Medical Education and Research (PGIMER) has instituted an annual oration, Professor R.N. Chakravarti Memorial Oration Lecture, in honour of Chakravarti.

References 

Recipients of the Padma Bhushan in science & engineering
1916 births
2007 deaths
Fellows of the Indian National Science Academy
Fellows of the Royal Society of Chemistry
Indian organic chemists
University of Calcutta alumni
20th-century Indian chemists
Scientists from West Bengal